The Type 97 57 mm tank gun was originally the main armament of the Imperial Japanese Army Type 97 Chi-Ha medium tank during the Second World War.

Design and use 

The Type 97 Chi-Ha tank was the most widely produced Japanese medium tank of the war, although the armor protection was average for a 1930s tank. The 57 mm main gun, designed for infantry support, was a carry over from the 1933 Type 89 medium tank.  The gun was a short barrelled weapon with a relatively low muzzle velocity, which was sufficient for supporting the infantry. However, in 1939 during the Battle of Khalkhin Gol (Nomonhan) against Soviet BT Tanks, the gun proved to be insufficient against the Soviet armor, causing the Japanese Army to have heavy tank losses.

After Nomonhan, new tank guns were developed for the Chi-Ha with a calibre of 47 mm - less than 57 mm tank gun - but having a longer barrel, and better penetration than the Type 97 gun.  From 1942 onwards, the Type 97 tanks were armed with the high velocity Type 1 47 mm tank gun in a new larger turret, and were designated the Type 97-Kai Shinhoto Chi-Ha.

Specifications 
The Type 97 57 mm tank gun had the following specifications:
Calibre: 57 mm 
Barrel length: 18.5 calibre (1.057 m)
Muzzle velocity: 355.3 m/s (1,166 ft/s)
Elevation: -15 to +20 degrees
Penetration 20 mm at 500 m
Shell: 
AP
HEAT
Weight: 1.80 kg, 
Length: 189 mm 
Diameter: 55 mm diameter

References 

World War II artillery of Japan
World War II tank guns
57 mm artillery
Tank guns of Japan
Military equipment introduced in the 1930s